The Hainan Open is a golf tournament on the Challenge Tour, beginning in 2016, held at the Sanya Luhuitou Golf Club in Hainan, China.

An event of the same name was played in 2014 and 2015 as part of PGA Tour China. Since 2017 it has been part of the China Tour. The 2014 event was held at Sanya Luhuitou Golf Club while in 2015 it was held at Dragon Valley Golf Course.

Winners

Notes

References

External links
Coverage on the Challenge Tour's official site

Former Challenge Tour events
Golf tournaments in China
Sport in Hainan
Recurring sporting events established in 2014